All Saints Notting Hill is a Church of England parish church in Talbot Road, Notting Hill, London. It is a Victorian Gothic Revival stone building with polychromatic decoration. The west tower has five stages with the stump of a spire, and the chancel has paintings by Henry Holiday.

The church was badly damaged by enemy action during World War II but was fully restored by 1951. It is a Grade II* listed building.

History
Building of All Saints' Church was begun in 1852 for the Reverend Dr Samuel Walker, to designs by architect William White, working with Sir George Gilbert Scott. The church was to be the centrepiece of the development now known as Colville and Powis Squares. Walker was deeply religious and his vision was for a church without pew rents for the newly built neighbourhood.

Walker ran short of money and was eventually declared bankrupt. The building was left unfinished for several years, lacking a spire, and remaining unfurnished, in which time it was nicknamed "All-Sinners-in-the-Mud".

All Saints was eventually completed in 1861 for the Reverend John Light of Trinity College Dublin, at a cost of £25,000. The spire in White's original designs was never completed.

Walter Passmore (1867–1946), a singer and actor best known for his comic baritone roles in Gilbert and Sullivan operas with the D'Oyly Carte Opera Company, was a choirboy at All Saints.

World War II and The Blitz
All Saints suffered serious bomb damage in The Blitz of World War II, along with neighbouring buildings including Pinehurst Court, at 1–9 Colville Gardens. The first bombs fell on 26 September 1940, and the church was hit again in March and June 1944. The Lady chapel and the south transept chapel were destroyed. Restoration work was completed in 1951.

Clergy
From 1931 to 1961 the vicar was the flamboyant Fr John Twisaday, who established the high church worship tradition at All Saints. The present vicar is Fr Philip Corbett SSC, who was inducted in 2019. All Saints' parish is part of the Anglo-Catholic Forward in Faith movement.

Vicars
 1861–85 John Light
 1885–96 Robert Trench
 1896–1907 Philip Herbert Learyk
 1907–31 Herbert Ridley
 1932–61 John Herbert Cloete Twisaday
 1961–66 John Herbert Brewer
 1966–67 John Henry Dixon
 1967–74 Peter Clark
 1976–2018 John Brownsell
 2019- Philip Corbett

Notes

References

 (EBook 21643)

External links

All Saints Notting Hill

Buildings and structures in Notting Hill
Notting Hill
Diocese of London
Grade II* listed churches in London
Grade II* listed buildings in the Royal Borough of Kensington and Chelsea
George Gilbert Scott buildings
Gothic Revival church buildings in London
Notting Hill
History of the Royal Borough of Kensington and Chelsea
1861 establishments in England
Notting Hill
Anglo-Catholic churches in England receiving AEO